Sampa may refer to:

Linguistics
 Speech Assessment Methods Phonetic Alphabet, for European languages
X-SAMPA, an international variant

People
 Sampa the Great (born 1993), Zambian-born Australian singer-songwriter and rapper
 Nsofwa Petronella Sampa (born c. 1992), Zambian HIV activist and clinical psychological counselor

Places
 Sampa, Burkina Faso
 Sampa, Ghana
 Sampa, a nickname for São Paulo, Brazil

Other uses
 "Sampa", a song by Caetano Veloso on the 1978 album Muito (Dentro da Estrela Azulada)
 South African Modern Pentathlon Association

See also
 Tsampa, a Tibetan and Himalayan staple foodstuff